Brother of Bommali is a 2014 Indian Telugu-language comedy film directed by B Chinni Krishna, produced by Ammiraju Kanumilli under Siri Cinema and starring Allari Naresh, Monal Gajjar, and Karthika Nair in the lead roles. The film soundtrack was composed by Shekar Chandra and the cinematographer was Adusumilli Vijay Kumar. Brother of Bommali was released on 7 November 2014. It was declared 'Super-Hit' at the box office. Karthika Nair's performance received high critical acclaim and received her first ever Filmfare Awards South nomination.

Plot
On a rainy night, the twins are born in a local government hospital. The older twin is a boy, Ramakrishna 'Ramky' (Allari Naresh) and the younger twin is a girl, Lakshmi 'Lucky' (Karthika Nair). Ramky is calm, seeking stability and focus while his sister Lucky is a streetwise tomboy who has grown up learning karate.  

The children grow up with Ramakrishna becoming an interior designer; content with a safe career and the approval of his family.  Lakshmi grows up into a wild and headstrong young woman.

Ramky falls in love with Shruthi (Monal Gajjar); another interior designer who works for a rival business. Shruti ends up working in Ramky's firm and after a series of incidents, returns his love, but his father declares he can only marry if he finds a husband for his sister first. 

Lucky confesses that she is in love with Harsha (Harshvardhan Rane) and stubbornly insists that he is the only man she will ever marry. From that point on, the entire cast starts doing everything possible to get Lucky married to Harsha.

Cast

 Allari Naresh as Ramakrishna / Ramky 
 Monal Gajjar as Shruti 
 Karthika Nair as Mahalakshmi / Lucky / Bommali
 Harshvardhan Rane as Harshavardhan "Harsha"
 Brahmanandam as Kona
 Ali as Pickpocket Neelam
 Vennela Kishore as Sandeep/Sandy
 Vineet Kumar as Shankar Bhupal
 Kelly Dorji as farmer , Previously as Malaysian NRI
 Srinivasa Reddy as himself
 Sudigali Sudheer as himself
 Madhunandan as himself
 Jaya Prakash Reddy as Boss for Ramki, Sandeep's Father
 Nagineedu as Surya Pratap
 Praveen as himself 
 Abhimanyu Singh as S/O Shankar Bhupal

Soundtrack
This film has five songs composed by Shekar Chandra with lyrics written by Sri Mani and Bhaskarabhatla. The audio launch was held in Hyderabad on 4 October 2014 through Shreyas Music.

Reception

Critical reception 
The film received mixed reviews from critics. Ch Sushil Rao of The Times of India gave it 2.5/5 and stated that "If you can enjoy the ridiculous, you will enjoy this. As far as performances are concerned, Naresh delivers quite well and Karthika's fights and dance are impressive. If you ignore some scenes that create confusion, it's an entertaining movie". Great Andhra wrote: "Not So Funny, Allari Naresh who has been struggling to get a hit for a very long time will have to wait longer". 123Telugu wrote: "On the whole, Brother of Bommali has the right mix of interesting story and some funny comedy. Complete first half, Naresh and Karthika’s performance are huge plus points. On the flip side, if you do not mind seeing Brahmanandam’s same old routine comedy and a predictable storyline, you can safely watch this film and would not be disappointed."

References

2014 directorial debut films
Indian comedy films
2014 masala films
2010s Telugu-language films